Yi Sun-sin trilogy is a South Korean period war action film series directed by Kim Han-min based on three major naval battles led by Admiral Yi Sun-sin. The first film The Admiral: Roaring Currents (2014) is based on Battle of Myeongnyang (1597), the second Hansan: Rising Dragon (2022) depicts Battle of Hansan Island (1592) and the last film Noryang: Sea of Death (2023) is based on Battle of Noryang (1598).

Overview

Cast

Development 

In 2013, while producing The Admiral: Roaring Currents, Big Stone Pictures revealed their plans to produce two more films related to Yi Sun-sin, titled Emergence of Hansan Dragon and Noryang: Sea of Death as sequels, depending on the success of The Admiral. Following the box office success of The Admiral which became the most-watched and highest-grossing film of all time in South Korea, production of the sequels was confirmed.

According to director Kim, the charm of Admiral Yi Sun-shin has left him spellbound and inspired him to make a film trilogy about one of Korea's most celebrated historical figures. In a statement in July 2022, Kim explained the different characteristics depicted in the three films:

Films

The Admiral: Roaring Currents (2014) 

Based on historical Battle of Myeongnyang (1597), The Admiral narrates the against-the-odds triumph over Japanese navy. The film focused on Yi’s planning for the battle and the swashbuckling naval clash. 61 minutes of its naval battle between 12 vessels of the Korean navy by led Yi and 330 invading Japanese ships, captivated the audience and was praised by the critics. The film attracted 17 million moviegoers becoming the most-viewed and highest-grossing film of all time in South Korea. It also became a box-office hit internationally and grossed US$138.3 million worldwide.

Hansan: Rising Dragon (2022) 

Hansan depicts the historical Battle of Hansan Island which took place five years before Battle of Myeongnyang depicted in The Admiral. The naval battle scenes which takes 51 minutes of screentime in the Hansan were shot using visual effects, unlike the previous film The Admiral which was actually filmed in a boat floating on the sea. It was released on 2,223 screens on July 27, 2022 in South Korea. It became the 2nd highest-grossing Korean film of 2022 with 7.26 million admissions.

Notes

References 

Film series introduced in 2014
South Korean film series
Trilogies
Films set in the 1590s
Cultural depictions of Yi Sun-sin
South Korean historical action films
South Korean action drama films
South Korean historical adventure films
South Korean war drama films
Films about Japan–Korea relations
Films about naval warfare
Films set in the Joseon dynasty
Action films based on actual events
War films based on actual events
Films about the Japanese invasions of Korea (1592–1598)